Claude Morinière (born 10 January 1960) is a retired French long jumper.

His personal best jump was 8.00 metres, achieved in May 1986 in Lisbon.

International competitions

References

1960 births
Living people
French male long jumpers
20th-century French people
21st-century French people